Hardwell Castle or Hardwell Camp is an Iron Age valley fort in the civil parish of Compton Beauchamp in Oxfordshire (previously Berkshire).

Site nature
Like nearby Cherbury Camp, it is not clearly in a strategic or easily defended position. It lies halfway down the scarp slope of the White Horse Hills and is tucked away in a curve, invisible from most angles. This particular positioning suggests its builders had a specialist purpose in mind, although exactly what that may have been remains a mystery. It is 'multi-vallate', like Cherbury Camp. It is unexcavated and therefore very little is known about it. The site is described as a promontory fort by Historic England, and has been a Scheduled Monument since 1958.

Location

References

History of Berkshire
Hill forts in Oxfordshire
Buildings and structures in Oxfordshire
Scheduled monuments in Oxfordshire
Tourist attractions in Oxfordshire
Vale of White Horse